The 2016–17 Charlotte 49ers women's basketball team represents the University of North Carolina at Charlotte during the 2016–17 NCAA Division I women's basketball season. The 49ers, led by fifth year head coach Cara Consuegra, play their home games at Dale F. Halton Arena and are members of Conference USA. They finished the season 21–10, 12–6 in C-USA play to finish in a tie for fourth place. They advance to the quarterfinals of the C-USA women's tournament where they lost to Louisiana Tech. Despite having 21 wins, they were not invited to a postseason tournament.

Roster

Rankings

Schedule

|-
!colspan=9 style="background:#00703C; color:#FFFFFF;"| Exhibition

|-
!colspan=9 style="background:#00703C; color:#FFFFFF;"| Non-conference regular season

|-
!colspan=9 style="background:#00703C; color:#FFFFFF;"| Conference USA regular season

|-
!colspan=9 style="background:#00703C; color:#FFFFFF;"| Conference USA Women's Tournament

See also
2016–17 Charlotte 49ers men's basketball team

References

Charlotte 49ers women's basketball seasons
Charlotte